Erik Leopold (Leo) Hildén (26 July 1876 – 31 March 1945) was a Finnish engineer and politician, born in Oulu. He was a member of the Parliament of Finland from 1919 to 1922, representing the Social Democratic Party of Finland (SDP).

References

1876 births
1945 deaths
People from Oulu
People from Oulu Province (Grand Duchy of Finland)
Swedish-speaking Finns
Social Democratic Party of Finland politicians
Members of the Parliament of Finland (1919–22)
20th-century Finnish engineers
Karlsruhe Institute of Technology alumni